Rin Rin the tadpole (Spanish: Rin Rin Renacuajo), also known as the tripping tadpole (El renacuajo paseador) (1884) is a stock character created by Colombian poet Rafael Pombo. It is still reprinted in compilations of children stories and nursery rhymes.

History

Rin Rin the tadpole represents the stereotype of the self-assured youth, never listening to his elders.  He is depicted in an aristocratic dandy fashion ("With short pants, a stylish necktie, hat with ribbons and a wedding frock coat").  His mother (naturally, a frog) asks him not to leave the house, but he doesn't listen to her.  The companions in his adventures are a young mouse ("el Niño Ratico"), and an old lady rat ("Doña Ratona"). They go around, partying and drinking beer.  Finally, due to this misconduct, they end tragically, devoured by predators. The mouse and rat were eaten by cats while the frog was devoured by a duck.

Cultural references

Rin Rin is one of the most recognized characters of the Colombian culture, and is commonly used in elementary school textbooks, nursery rhymes and children literature compilations.

The Mexican musician Silvestre Revueltas composed his ballet El renacuajo paseador in 1936.

Representations of the character are used in parades and carnivals. In recent years, the theme parks Mundo Aventura and Colombian National Coffee Park have used animatronic versions of the tadpole.

References

El renacuajo paseador at WikiSource 
Animated cartoon at http://aromadepapel.blogspot.com/2009/07/rin-rin-renacuajo-rafael-pombo.html

Colombian literature
Characters in children's literature
Male characters in literature
Fictional frogs
Nursery rhymes